Bechyn is an unincorporated community in Henryville Township, Renville County, Minnesota, United States.

References

Unincorporated communities in Renville County, Minnesota
Unincorporated communities in Minnesota
Czech-American culture in Minnesota

Bechyn, Minnesota World, 2021 "A Brief History of Bechyn"